Kamla Chaudhry (1908–1970) was an Indian short story writer in Hindi language and  Jagadeesh Kumar a Member of Parliament from Hapur in the 3rd Lok Sabha.

Early life
Kamla Chaudhry was born on 22 February 1908 in Lucknow. Her father Rai Manmohan Dayal was a deputy collector. Her maternal great grandfather was the commander of Independent Awadh forces at Lucknow in 1857 First War of Independence.

Career
During the 1930 Civil disobedience movement, Chaudhry joined the Indian National Congress. Since then she was actively involved in the Indian Independence Movement and was imprisoned by the British authorities multiple times. She acted as the Senior Vice-chairperson during the 54th session of the All India Congress Committee. She was an elected member of the Constituent Assembly of India and after the constitution was adopted she served as a member of the Provincial Government of India till 1952. She was also a member of the Uttar Pradesh State Social Welfare Advisory Board.

In 1962, Chaudhry became a member of the 3rd Lok Sabha after winning the 1962 Indian general election from Hapur as an official candidate of the INC. She defeated her nearest rival by a margin of 28,633 votes. Four collections of her stories; Unmaad (1934), Picnic (1936), Yatra (1947) and Bel Patra were published. Gender discrimination, exploitation of peasants and poor condition of widows were main themes in her works.

Personal life
She married J.M. Chaudhry in February 1922. 
Her father in law was one of founders of Swarajya Party. 
She had several children including Writer and Author Dr. Ira Saxena as well as Late Madhavendra Mohan and Dr. Hemendra Mohan Chaudhry.

References

1908 births
India MPs 1962–1967
Women members of the Lok Sabha
Lok Sabha members from Uttar Pradesh
Writers from Lucknow
Indian National Congress politicians from Uttar Pradesh
Women writers from Uttar Pradesh
Writers in British India
20th-century Indian short story writers
Hindi-language writers
Indian independence activists from Uttar Pradesh
Members of the Constituent Assembly of India
Year of death missing
People from Hapur district
Politicians from Lucknow
20th-century Indian women writers
Indian women short story writers